Fiebre de amor (in English: Love Fever) is a 1985 Mexican musical drama film. This film won the Diosa Award for best picture.

Plot 
A teenage girl with a crush  on a young popular singing star daydreams about meeting and falling in love with him. She accidentally witnesses a mob murder and while attempting to escape the perpetrators she hides in a hotel bungalow. This happens to be the bungalow of her favorite singer and he gets roped into her escape from these men. The young star comes to her rescue in this romantic comedy with many songs and the Acapulco scenery as a backdrop.

Cast 
 Lucero as Lucerito
 Luis Miguel as himself
 Lorena Velázquez
 Guillermo Murray
 Maribel Fernández
 Carlos Monden
 Monica Sanchez Navarro

Soundtrack
A soundtrack was released in 1985, with Luis Miguel and Lucerito as the only performers.

References

External links 
 

1985 films
Films about time travel
Mexican musical drama films
1980s Spanish-language films
1980s Mexican films